Michael Kruger may refer to:

 Michael J. Kruger, American theologian
 Michael Krüger (footballer) (born 1954), German football coach and former player
 Michael Krüger (writer) (born 1943), German writer, publisher and translator